Kwak Jung-hye (born 19 November 1986) is a South Korean sports shooter. She competed in the women's 10 metre air pistol event at the 2016 Summer Olympics.

References

External links
 

1986 births
Living people
South Korean female sport shooters
Olympic shooters of South Korea
Shooters at the 2016 Summer Olympics
Sportspeople from Jeju Province
Asian Games medalists in shooting
Asian Games gold medalists for South Korea
Medalists at the 2014 Asian Games
Shooters at the 2014 Asian Games
ISSF pistol shooters
Shooters at the 2018 Asian Games
Shooters at the 2020 Summer Olympics
20th-century South Korean women
21st-century South Korean women